Dwaraka Tirumala is a census town in Eluru district of the Indian state of Andhra Pradesh. It is located in Dwaraka Tirumala mandal of Jangareddygudem revenue division. The Venkateswara Temple is a pilgrimage center for hindus, which is the abode of Lord Venkateswara. This is often referred by the locals as Chinna Tirupati, meaning mini Tirupati.

Transport

APSRTC operates buses from Eluru, Rajamahendravaram, Tadepalligudem, Vijayawada, Chintalapudi, Jangareddygudem, Bhimadole, Hyderabad and Tadepalligudem, Bhadrachalam to Dwarakatirumala bus station.

References

External links
 Dwaraka Tirumala

Cities and towns in Eluru district
Census towns in Andhra Pradesh